East Coast Dedicated Freight Corridor or East Coast DFC is a proposed freight specific railway in India under the Special Purpose Vehicle (SPV). It will be constructed by Dedicated Freight Corridor Corporation of India (DFCCIL) of Indian Railways. It is going to be a broad gauge double line-electrified corridor. This corridor will run from Kharagpur in West Bengal to Vijayawada in Andhra Pradesh. The total cost of the project would be around ₹44,000 crore (US$6 billion).

References 

Transport in Kharagpur
Transport in Vijayawada
Dedicated freight corridors of India
Rail transport in Andhra Pradesh
Rail transport in West Bengal
5 ft 6 in gauge railways in India
Proposed infrastructure in Andhra Pradesh